Desmond Choo Pey Ching (born 1978) is a Singaporean politician and former police officer who has been serving as Mayor of North East District since 2017 and Assistant Secretary-General of the National Trades Union Congress since 2015. A member of the governing People's Action Party (PAP), he has been the Member of Parliament (MP) representing the Tampines Changkat division of Tampines GRC since 2015.

Education 
Choo attended Ai Tong School, Catholic High School and National Junior College, before graduating from the University of Chicago, majoring in economics under the Singapore Police Force Overseas Merit
Scholarship.

Career
Choo was awarded a government university scholarship and upon graduation, he served his scholarship bond in the Singapore Police Force, where he served 12 years in senior officer ranks including commanding officer of the Woodlands Neighbourhood Police Centre, head of the Special Investigation Section and deputy commander of the Clementi Police Division. He also served a stint on secondment to the Ministry of Manpower, where he was the deputy director of the Foreign Workforce Policy Department and was also a bodyguard assistant for the swearing-in of Prime Minister Lee Hsien Loong and other new cabinet ministers at the Istana on 12 August 2004.

Choo resigned from the Singapore Police Force with the rank of Deputy Superintendent of Police to join the NTUC in 2010. After serving on probation as the deputy director of the NTUC's Youth Development Unit, he later became deputy director of the Industrial Relations Unit. He also concurrently served as the executive secretary of the Union of Security Employees and the Singapore Shell Employees Union.

After a stint in 2013 in the private sector with Kestrel Capital Pte Ltd, an investment firm, Desmond returned to the public sector to rejoin NTUC in April 2014 and is now the assistant secretary-general of National Trades Union Congress (NTUC). Choo is also the Director of Policy Division at NTUC that oversees the economic and social policies, strategic communications and international affairs. He advocates for young workers and young families, helps workers cope with restructuring and make the most of new job opportunities highlighted in the Industry Transformation Maps. He is also the Executive Secretary of the Union of Telecoms Employees of Singapore and Advisor to the Young NTUC Committee.

Political career
A member of the country's governing People's Action Party (PAP), he is currently a mayor of the North East District of Singapore. He has been a Member of Parliament (MP) representing the Tampines Group Representation Constituency for Tampines Changkat since 2015.

Choo stood as a candidate for Singapore's governing People's Action Party (PAP) at the 2011 general election in the single-member constituency of Hougang, where he was defeated by Yaw Shin Leong of the Workers' Party by 14,850 votes (64.8%) to 8,065 (35.2%). (The constituency had previously been represented in Parliament by the Workers' Party's leader, Low Thia Khiang, from 1991 to 2011.) After Yaw was expelled from the Workers' Party and lost his seat in Parliament in 2012, the PAP announced that Choo would be the party's candidate in the 2012 Hougang by-election. He was defeated in the by-election by Png Eng Huat of the Workers' Party by 13,460 votes (62.1%) to 8,223 (37.9%).

He was then appointed Chairperson of Manpower Government Parliamentary Committee (GPC) in the 14th Parliament of Singapore.

Personal life

Choo married in July 2011.

Choo's uncle, Choo Wee Khiang, was a PAP Member of Parliament from 1988 to 1999 who had been convicted of cheating in 1999 after resigning from his position in Parliament. Choo had described his uncle as a source of inspiration and counsel.

References

External links
 Desmond Choo on Parliament of Singapore

People's Action Party politicians
University of Chicago alumni
Living people
1977 births
Singaporean people of Teochew descent
Singaporean trade unionists
Members of the Parliament of Singapore